WOND (1400 AM) is a commercial radio station licensed to Pleasantville, New Jersey, and serving the Atlantic City radio market.  It is owned by Longport Media and broadcasts a news/talk radio format. The radio studios and offices are located offshore in Linwood, New Jersey.

WOND is powered at 1,000 watts using a non-directional antenna.  The AM transmitter is on Old Turnpike in Pleasantville, near the Atlantic City Expressway.  Programming is also heard on FM translator W223CO at 92.3 MHz.

Programming
On weekdays, WOND has local hosts during the day, including The Don Williams Show, Talking with Anne Baker, Midday with David Spatz, Klein Time with Dan Klein,  Off the Press with Scott Cronick and The Lorry Young Show.  Nights feature nationally syndicated programs:  The Lars Larson Show, The Jim Bohannon Show, Coast to Coast AM with George Noory and America in The Morning.

Weekend syndicated hosts include Handel on The Law with Bill Handel, The Kim Komando Show and Sunday Night Live with Bill Cunningham.  Most hours begin with an update from ABC News Radio.

History
WOND is one of the Atlantic City market's legacy radio stations, first signing on the air in July 1950 as a network affiliate of ABC Radio.

In the 1960s, it was a Top 40 radio station, and its morning show was hosted by Bob Weems, one of the area's best-remembered DJs. The station was home to the long-running Pinky's Corner, hosted by Seymour "Pinky" Kravitz. The show called WOND home for 57 years before his retirement and death in 2015.

TV journalist Jessica Savitch began her career as a teen DJ on a show called Teen Talk in 1962. She used "Wild Weekend" as a theme song. She called herself "Wonda" for a short time. The station also launched the career of Tom Lamaine, long-time radio personality at WIP in Philadelphia and then at KYW-TV.

In 1988, John Kobylt and Ken Chiampou were teamed together for the first time as morning show co-hosts. They later hosted afternoons at "New Jersey 101.5" WKXW-FM and then made the jump in 1992 to Los Angeles's top talk station, KFI 640 AM.

"First Lady of the Airwaves" Barbara Altman also broadcast her weekday call-in show Barbara Altman's Front Porch from WOND for decades.

References

External links
WOND official website

OND
News and talk radio stations in the United States